Emma Slade, also known as Ani Pema Deki  (born 16 July 1966), is a British yoga and meditation instructor, author, and charity founder best known for becoming the first Western woman to become a Bhuddist nun in Bhutan. Slade was expanding her CFA certification when she was held at gunpoint and robbed while on a business trip in Jakarta. This experience inspired her to lean into the feeling of compassion and study Buddhism. Her autobiography, Set Free: A Life-Changing Journey from Banking to Buddhism in Bhutan, was published in 2017.

Early life and education
Slade was born on 16 July, 1966 in Whitstable, Kent, the eldest of three children, to David and Zinnia Slade (née Devan). She attended Joy Lane Primary School, Barton Court Grammar School, and Sevenoaks School. She earned eight O-levels; English, history, and geography at A-Level; and English and geography at S-level. Because of her scores, she was offered a place at Cambridge University to study English at Selwyn College, and was not required to sit the entrance exam. She started in 1985 and later changed from English to history. She left in the autumn term of her final year and visited her parents who had moved to Summit, New Jersey, USA. Slade returned to Cambridge and worked at an Iceland supermarket until being accepted to the Cambridge College of Arts and Technology for the Art foundation course. She then attended Goldsmiths, University of London for a Fine Art degree and earned the only two first class honours awarded on the course to 1993 graduates. The other was given to her fellow student, future film director Steve McQueen. In her final year at Goldsmiths, her father was diagnosed with lung cancer; he passed away when she was 26. Though she had planned to become an artist or curator, she decided to go into investment banking so she could "make a living and not lean on mum."

Career and robbery
Slade worked briefly at a retirement home in Whitstable before applying to HSBC's Global Banking Graduate Programme, to which she was accepted with five other people. She was the only woman in the programme. Slade finished the Graduate Programme with a Investment Management Certificate, then enrolled in a Chartered Financial Analyst course run by AIMR. She completed her first set of CFA exams in New York City in 1995 before returning to London. The following year, she went to Hong Kong to work in marketing while finishing her third level exams. She completed the programme in 1997 with the highest marks.

In September 1997, while on a business trip, Slade was held at gunpoint in her Jakarta hotel room. The English press incorrectly reported that she had been on holiday.  When the Jakarta police showed her a picture of her attacker bloodied and in his underwear, she was unexpectedly "overwhelmed with compassion for him, and for me, and for the whole situation." She finished her business trip accompanied by a bodyguard before returning to work in Hong Kong. Shortly after, she was diagnosed with severe post-traumatic stress disorder. She struggled with flashbacks and difficulty separating the past and present. After "unexpected hostility" from her supervisor, she returned to England, where she joined an intensive two-week therapy programme in Ticehurst Priory's PTSD unit. Slade continued to work at HSBC in London after her discharge but had difficulty finding satisfaction in her career. The robbery, though traumatic, made her want to "explore more of what [she] could potentially do with [her] life." She left HSBC in 1998 but returned to work as a hedge fund analyst from 2005 to 2008.

Buddhism
During the summer of 1998, Slade's mother paid for her to travel to the island of Skyros and take time for herself. She tried yoga for the first time , which inspired her to continue travelling to study with the best teachers and become a yoga teacher herself. Her teachers included Nancy Gilgoff in Hawaii, Tias Little in Santa Fe, New Mexico, Dena Ginsberg in Byron Bay, Australia, David Swenson in Costa Rica, and John Scott in Cornwall. She qualified in 2001 as a British Wheel of Yoga instructor and set up her studio, Whitstable Yoga, in her hometown. Slade visited the Kagyu Samye Ling Monastery and Tibetan Centre in Eskdalemuir in the Scottish Borders in July 2003 for a series of short retreats centered on meditation and Buddhist philosophy, particularly about compassion. The same year, she formally converted to Buddhism.

Slade visited Bhutan in 2011, where she met Nima Tshering, who she assumed was a monk, at the Druk Wangyal Lhakhang temple and Brent Hyde, the General Managed of the Zhiwa Ling Hotel in Paro. Hyde offered her a job as a yoga teacher at the hotel over Christmas and she accepted. When she returned, she learned that Nima Thsering was a Lama, not a monk, and that he had gone on retreat for three years. She later learned he was visiting his home village and they met at the Zhiwa Ling Hotel on 31 December 2011. They started her tuition in Tibetan Buddhism the following day, then over the phone when she returned to England. The Lama encouraged her to begin dressing in monastic robes to complement her already-shaved head. The following year, she received the name Ani Pema Deki, meaning Nun Lotus Blissful, at a naming ceremony conducted by Rinpoche Gyalsey Tenzin Radgye, Lama Nima Tshering's teacher. Despite this, she worried she was unable to become a Bhuddist nun, called a Bhikkhunī, since she was raising her son in England and was unable to attend the required retreats. With the encouragement of the Lama, however, she rearranged her life in Whitstable to accommodate the retreats. She returned to Bhutan in February 2014 with her seven-year-old son and was ordained as the first Western woman to be ordained as a Bhikkhunī in the country. As of 2018, she was still the only Western woman to hold this title.

In 2015, Slade founded Opening Your Heart, an organisation benefiting Bhutanese children. It became an official British charity the following year. Their first project included installing cold showers and toilets in the local monastery and improving education facilities in the rural village of Meritsemo. Opening Your Heart focuses on providing access to and training to ensure safe healthcare and education, and disability aids. They also organise educational projects. The proceeds from Slade's autobiography entirely benefit the charity. She was invited to a reception hosted by the King and Queen of Bhutan at the Taj Tashi Hotel in Thimphu in April 2016, where she met the Duke and Duchess of Cambridge.

Slade's autobiography, Set Free: A Life-Changing Journey From Banking to Buddhism in Bhutan, was released in 2017 by Summersdale Publishers. She also served as the voice for the audio book. As a public speaker, Slade has given talks internationally, including at the Foreign Correspondents' Club in Hong Kong and the Sevenoaks School in Kent for a TEDx Talk in 2017 and the Oxford Human Rights Festival in 2018. In 2017, she appeared on Clare Balding's Sunday morning Radio 2 Show, Davina Hour with Davina McCall, and Nicky Campbell's Big Questions. She was also the subject of a short film called Happiness by the Dalai Lama Centre for Compassion in Oxford. She was awarded the Points of Light Award from the British Prime Minister in 2017 for her service in Bhutan and was shortlisted for the Asian Voice Charity Award for "Most Inspiring Individual in Charity" in 2018.

Personal life
Slade was in a long-term relationship with an English sculptor that ended in 2005, when she was informed she was unable to have children. She moved back to London to continue in the banking sector and had a brief relationship with another CFA, after which she found she was pregnant. Their son Oscar was born in September 2006. As of 2018, Slade lives in Whitstable, where she teaches yoga and meditation and manages Opening Your Heart. She travels regularly to Bhutan.

References

External links
 Opening Your Heart to Bhutan - Emma Slade
 Why I swapped investment banking for Buddhism in Bhutan, interview with Caroline Eden of The Guardian
My Path To Becoming A Buddhist - TEDxSevenoaksSchool
Summersdale bio
Official website

1966 births
Living people
Alumni of the University of Cambridge
Alumni of Goldsmiths, University of London
English Buddhists
British charity and campaign group workers
CFA charterholders
British Buddhist nuns
21st-century Buddhist nuns
HSBC people